Lisa Harris may refer to:
 Lisa E. Harris, multimedia artist, opera singer and composer
 Lisa Harris (politician) Canadian politician
 Bethany Campbell and Lisa Harris, pen-names of Sally McCluskey, American writer of romance novels